Leonie Fiebich (born 10 January 2000) is a German professional basketball player for the Casademont Zaragoza of the Liga Femenina de Baloncesto. She was drafted by the Los Angeles Sparks in the second round of the 2020 WNBA draft and has played for the German national basketball team.

Early life
Fiebich's home club was the DJK Landsberg, and at the age of 14 she trained and played for Landsberg's women team as a youth player.

Professional career
Fiebich started her professional career for TS Jahn München in 2016. In her first season, she averaged 12.1 points and 8.5 rebounds and 1.3 assists per game. In her second season, she averaged 16.2 points and 7.4 rebounds and 2.1 assists per game. She was signed by Wasserburg for the 2018–19 season. She was named best Bundesliga newcomer of the 2018–19 season as she averaged 10.3 points, 8 rebounds and 1.6 assists per game. She played just one game in the 2019–20 season after she tore her cruciate ligament at the 2019 FIBA Under-19 Women's Basketball World Cup.

On 17 April 2020, the Los Angeles Sparks selected Fiebich with the 22nd overall pick in the 2020 WNBA draft.

Fiebich returned to Wasserburg for the 2020–21 season.

For the 2021–22 season, Fiebich joined French team Flammes Carolo Basket. She then moved to Australia to play for the Warwick Senators during the 2022 NBL1 West season.

For the 2022–23 season, Fiebich joined Casademont Zaragoza of the Liga Femenina de Baloncesto.

National team career

Junior teams
Fiebich won the silver medal with the German national under-16 basketball team at the 2016 FIBA Under16 European Championship where she averaged 11.9 points, 11.6 rebounds and 1.6 assists per game. She also participated at the 2018 FIBA Under18 European Championship where she won the gold medal and averaged 11.7 points, 8.7 rebounds and 2.3 assists per game and was selected to the "team of the tournament. She also participated at the 2019 FIBA Under-19 Basketball World Cup where she averaged 7 points, 9 rebounds and 3.3 assists per game.

Senior team
In October 2018, she made her debut with the German national basketball team.

References

2000 births
Living people
German women's basketball players
Forwards (basketball)
German expatriate basketball people in the United States
Los Angeles Sparks draft picks
People from Landsberg am Lech
Sportspeople from Upper Bavaria